The Professional Football League of Ukraine Under-19 is the second tier league for the Ukrainian football reserve team, the parent clubs of which compete in the Ukrainian First League or other lower leagues (teams that do not compete in Premier League U-19).

The competitions are administered jointly by the Professional Football League of Ukraine and the Ukrainian Youth Football League.

History 
The League was established in 2016 for the 2016–17 season. The relegation and promotion procedure of the league is not regulated. Some teams, clubs of which would gain promotion through competition of senior squads, continue to play in the Ukrainian Premier League competitions among under-19 teams. The competition is voluntary and no teams are required to be relegated. The competition is opened to any teams of the Professional Football League of Ukraine (including First and Second leagues), for which it is initially was intended, as well as other youth football clubs and sports schools. No clubs from any of league of the PFL (First or Second) are required to field their under-19 team in the competition. The competition is intended to help prepare a youth squad if a club would gain promotion to the Ukrainian Premier League.

A playing season of the league consists of two parts, the first group stage which consists of several groups composed based on geographic principal where teams play double round robin. The best top teams qualify for finals which usually are played also in group format on "neutral turf" to identify a champion.

Seasons

Teams
As of 2021 there were at least 10 teams competing in every season since 2016 and 5 more since 2017.

 since 2016 – FC Barsa Sumy (Amateurs), FC Cherkaskyi Dnipro (PFL 1→Amateurs, renamed), DYuSSh-15 Kyiv (Amateurs), MFC Zhytomyr (Amateur→PFL 2, renamed), Olimpik-SDYuShOR-2 Kropyvnytskyi (Amateurs, renamed), FC Bukovyna Chernivtsi (PFL 1→2), Teplovyk-DYuSSh-3 Ivano-Frankivsk (PFL 2→1, renamed), FC Podillya Khmelnytskyi (PFL 2), Hirnyk Novoyavorivsk (Amateurs), ARZ Bila Tservka (Amateurs, renamed)

 since 2017 – Nika Ivano-Frankivsk (Amateurs), Lyubomyr Stavyshche (Amateurs), FC Lokomotyv Kyiv (Amateurs), Atletyk Odesa (Amateurs), FC Helios Kharkiv (PFL 1→Amateurs, renamed)

Please note, in 2018 based on the Cherkaskyi Dnipro under-19 team there was revived FC Dnipro Cherkasy, while Cherkaskyi Dnipro was reorganized as FC Cherkashchyna due to financial hardship, see the club's article for more information. Also, in 2018 Kobra Kharkiv tried to replace FC Helios Kharkiv in the Ukrainian First League, but was not successful, its junior team however was admitted in under-19 competitions replacing the Helios Kharkiv under-19 team.

See also 
Ukrainian First League
Ukrainian Premier League Reserves and Under 19
Ukrainian Youth Football League, main national youth competitions among teenagers in four age categories up to under 17 and divided into two leagues for each age category

References

External links
 Ukrainian Championship Under-19. First League at Amsport
 Junior Championship Under-19 at Gold Talant
 First League Under-19 at Football Federation of Ukraine

Youth 2
Sports leagues established in 2016
2016 establishments in Ukraine
Youth football in Ukraine
Ukraine 2